Walter Kamau Bell (born January 26, 1973)  is an American stand-up comic and television host. He has hosted the CNN series United Shades of America since 2016, and hosted FXX television series Totally Biased with W. Kamau Bell from 2012 to 2013. He is the host of the live radio show and podcast Kamau Right Now on KALW, and also co-hosts the podcasts Denzel Washington Is The Greatest Actor Of All Time Period with Kevin Avery (comedian) and Politically Re-Active with Hari Kondabolu. In 2022, Bell directed and produced the documentary miniseries We Need to Talk About Cosby.

Early life and education
Bell was born in Palo Alto, California, and grew up in Alabama, Boston, and Chicago. He is the only child of Walter Bell, who served as Alabama's Insurance Commissioner and Chairman of Swiss Re America Holding Corporation, and author Janet Cheatham Bell, who founded a self-publishing firm. Between ages five and 12, Bell lived in Boston, Massachusetts in the Mattapan neighborhood of the city. Bell graduated from the University of Chicago Laboratory Schools and attended the University of Pennsylvania before dropping out. Later he began to pursue a career in comedy.

He is a first cousin once removed of speculative fiction writer N.K. Jemisin.

Career 
After establishing himself as a sociopolitical comedian and community activist based in San Francisco, Bell became a founding member of the comedy collective Laughter Against the Machine and has been featured in a number of prominent podcasts and publications, such as WTF with Marc Maron, Citizen Radio, and Current TV's The War Room with Jennifer Granholm, on which Bell was a regular correspondent.

His first comedy album, One Night Only, was released in 2007. Also in 2007, he developed a one-man show titled The W. Kamau Bell Curve: Ending Racism in About An Hour, "a comedic exploration of the current state of America's racism", which he periodically performs in updated versions.

His follow-up album, Face Full of Flour, was released in 2010, and was named one of the Top 10 Best Comedy Albums of the year by iTunes and Punchline Magazine. From 2011 to 2012, he wrote the blog "Kamau's Komedy Korner" for the San Francisco Weekly. In 2012, Bell was voted San Francisco's best comedian by the SF Weekly, the San Francisco Bay Guardian, and 7×7 Magazine.

His first stand-up comedy TV special, Semi-Prominent Negro, premiered on Showtime on April 29, 2016, and on September 30, 2016, his third full-length album with the same title, was released on Kill Rock Stars.

On November 7, 2017, Bell became the Frank Sinatra Artist-in-Residence of Santa Clara University in Santa Clara, California.

Television 
From 2012 to 2013, Bell hosted a weekly stand up comedy television series, Totally Biased with W. Kamau Bell, first on FX and later on FXX. The show, produced by Chris Rock, provided observational comedy and commentary on social and political issues in addition to celebrity interviews. After the show was cancelled in November 2013, Bell moved back to California from New York.

He is currently the host of the award-winning CNN documentary series United Shades of America, which premiered on April 24, 2016. The series has been nominated for several Emmy Awards: from 2016 to 2019 (4 nominations) it was nominated for Outstanding Unstructured Reality Program; in 2021 it was nominated for  Outstanding Hosted Nonfiction Series Or Special. Bell was also nominated as Outstanding Host in 2017 and 2018. Bell is Executive Producer of the show, accepting the award for Creative Arts Emmy for Outstanding Unstructured Reality Program in 2017, 2018 and 2019.

The show United Shades of America was renewed for season 3 in 2018. The first episode of the show was aired on the 29th of April 2018. The season consisted of 8 episodes. The last episode, titled "Native Hawaii" aired on July 1, 2018. Later in July 2018, Bell was nominated for Primetime Emmy Award for Outstanding Host for a Reality Program for hosting United Shades of America.

In 2022, Bell directed and produced the documentary miniseries We Need to Talk About Cosby. It explores the life and career of Bill Cosby to his sexual assault cases. It premiered on January 30, 2022, on Showtime.

Podcast host 

From 2010 to 2014, Bell co-hosted the podcast The Field Negro Guide to Arts & Culture with Living Colour guitarist Vernon Reid.

Since November 2014, Bell has co-hosted the Earwolf-produced podcast Denzel Washington Is The Greatest Actor Of All Time Period with comedian and writer Kevin Avery. In addition to reviewing the films of Denzel Washington one by one, the podcast has also featured interviews with prominent actors, filmmakers, musicians, and comedians including Spike Lee, Ava DuVernay, Jesse Williams, Issa Rae, and Ryan Coogler.

Since January 2016, he has hosted Kamau Right Now, a live radio show and podcast produced by KALW.

Since June 2016, he has also co-hosted the Panoply/First Look Media-produced podcast Politically Re-Active with comedian Hari Kondabolu. The podcast explores American politics and elections with a comedic approach, and includes interviews with activists, journalists, and scholars such as Ian Haney López, Robert Reich, and Pramila Jayapal.

Author 
Bell has authored a number of essays and blog posts about race and racism in American politics and media. In May 2017, Bell published his first book, The Awkward Thoughts of W. Kamau Bell: Tales of a 6'4, African American, Heterosexual, Cisgender, Left-Leaning, Asthmatic, Black and Proud Blerd, Mama's Boy, Dad, and Stand-Up Comedian. The book is a humorous autobiography interspersed with essays about politics and popular culture.

Activism 

Bell sits on the advisory boards of Race Forward, a racial justice think tank (formerly known as the Applied Research Center), and Hollaback!, an anti-harassment organization. In October 2013, he was named the American Civil Liberties Union celebrity ambassador on racial justice.

Implicit bias incident in 2015 

On January 26, 2015, Bell and his wife Melissa were involved in an incident at the Elmwood Cafe in Berkeley, California, which Bell alleged was racially motivated. Bell reported online that an employee of the cafe told him to "scram", or words to that effect, while he was talking to his white wife and her friends at one of its outdoor tables.   He had approached the women from the outside casually dressed (e.g., wearing a knit cap), and the employee, a waitress, assumed he was "selling something," which Bell took as code for "homeless."  The cafe owner fired the waitress, and, with Bell, held a community forum to discuss implicit bias and how to improve. Bell's account was eventually featured in an episode of the radio series This American Life titled "Birds & Bees". After April 2018 arrests of two black men at a Starbucks gained media attention, Bell renewed his criticism of the Elmwood Cafe. It closed soon after. The cafe reopened a month later with former manager and current co-owner Kara Hammond changing the name to Baker & Commons.

Personal life 
Bell dated Melissa Hudson Bell starting in 2003, and they married in 2009. They have three children.

Bell underwent a vasectomy in May 2019.

Filmography

Television

Discography
2007: One Night Only
2010: Face Full of Flour
2016: Semi-Prominent Negro

References

External links 

 
 

1973 births
21st-century American comedians
African-American stand-up comedians
American stand-up comedians
American television talk show hosts
African-American television hosts
American comedy writers
CNN people
Comedians from Illinois
Late night television talk show hosts
Living people
People from Chicago
People from Mattapan
Place of birth missing (living people)
University of Chicago Laboratory Schools alumni
University of Pennsylvania alumni
21st-century African-American people
20th-century African-American people